Dohtuheh-ye Olya (also Romanized as Dohtūheh-ye ‘Olyā and Dūtūyeh-ye ‘Olyā; also known as Dowpūyeh-ye Bālā, Do Tūyeh-ye Bālā, Dotūyeh-ye Bālā, and Dūtuyeh Bāla) is a village in Kahrizak Rural District, Kahrizak District, Ray County, Tehran Province, Iran. At the 2006 census, its population was 126, in 31 families.

References 

Populated places in Ray County, Iran